Koza may refer to:

Places
 Koza, Opole Voivodeship, a village in south-west Poland
 Koza, Wakayama, a Japanese town, merged in 2005 into Kushimoto
 Kōza District, Kanagawa, a Japanese district in Kanagawa Province
 Koza, Okinawa, a city in Okinawa, Japan
 Koza Station, railway station in Kushimoto, Higashimuro District, Wakayama Prefecture, Japan.
 Koza, Cameroon, a commune in Cameroon
 Koza Han, historic caravanserai (han) in Bursa, Turkey

Surname
 Casimir Koza (1935 – 2010), French footballer
Dave Koza (born 1954), American baseball player
 John Koza, 20th-century computer scientist and genetic programming pioneer
Luxolo Koza (born 1994), South African rugby union player
Paballo Koza (born 2002),  South African actor
 (1954–2012), Czech physician, hematooncologist

Other
 Koza (bagpipe), a type of Polish bagpipe
 Koza (film), a 2015 Slovak film
 KOZA, a defunct American radio station

See also